Ian Cheng (born March 29, 1984) is an American artist known for his live simulations that explore the capacity of living agents to deal with change. His simulations, commonly understood as "virtual ecosystems" are "less about the wonders of new technologies than about the potential for these tools to realize ways of relating to a chaotic existence." His work has been widely exhibited internationally, including MoMA PS1, Serpentine Galleries, Whitney Museum of American Art, Hirshhorn Museum, Fondazione Sandretto Re Rebaudengo, and other institutions.

Early life and education
Cheng was born in Los Angeles, CA, in 1984. Cheng attended Van Nuys High School. Cheng graduated from University of California, Berkeley in 2006 with a dual degree in cognitive science and art practice. Cheng worked at Industrial Light & Magic, George Lucas's visual effects company. Cheng attended Columbia University, where he earned his MFA in 2009. Cheng worked in the studio of artist Pierre Huyghe from 2010 to 2012 and also worked as co-director at Paul Chan's independent New York based publishing company, Badlands Unlimited, founded in 2010.

Work
Cheng popularized the use of simulation as a medium available to artistic practice, capable of composing together both man-made and algorithmically generated content that together produce emergent behavior over an infinite duration. Cheng's work highlights the capacity of simulation to express the unpredictable dynamic between order and chaos in a complex system. Cheng coined the term “live simulation” as a subset of simulation that is presented in public in real-time without regard for an optimal outcome or pre-defined fitness criteria. Since 2013, Cheng has produced a series of simulations exploring an AI-based agent's capacity to deal with an ever-changing environment.

From 2015 to 2017, Cheng developed Emissaries, a trilogy of episodic live simulations that “explore the history of cognitive evolution, past and future.” Unlike previous simulations, Emissaries introduced a narrative agent, the emissary, whose motivation to enact a story was set into conflict with the open-ended chaos of the simulation. Cheng describes the archetype of the emissary as one who "is caught between unravelling old realities and emerging weird one," an embodied way to explore the relationship between meaning and meaninglessness. Cheng drew inspiration from the narrative nature of consciousness described by Julian Jaynes in The Origin of Consciousness in the Breakdown of the Bicameral Mind.

At Serpentine Galleries in 2018, Cheng premiered BOB (Bag of Beliefs), an AI-based creature whose personality, body, and life script evolve across exhibitions in what Cheng calls “art with a nervous system.”

BOB premiered in the United States in 2019 at Gladstone Gallery. BOB features a unique model of AI that combines an inductive engine for the learning of rule-based beliefs from sensory experiences with a motivational framework composed of mini-personalities called "demons". Each demon competes for control of BOB's body in a "congress of demons", and each utilizes the inductive engine to achieve its motivations while minimizing surprise. Viewers were invited to send their own stream of stimuli to BOB through BOB Shrine, an iOS app.

Other activities
Cheng directed the music video Brats, by Liars.

At Frieze London in 2013, Cheng premiered Entropy Wrangler Cloud, one of the first artworks made for virtual reality, using first generation Oculus Rift headsets.

Cheng developed Bad Corgi, an iOS app commissioned by Serpentine Galleries, which has been called a "shadowy mindfulness app for contemplating chaos."

Exhibitions 

Life After BOB: The Chalice Study at Light Art Space, Berlin, 2022
Emissaries at Fundacion Fernando de Castro, 2020
Uncanny Valley: Being Human in the Age of AI at de Young Museum, 2020 
Mud Muses at Moderna Museet, Stockholm, 2019
If the Snake at Okayama Art Summit, 2019
May You Live in Interesting Times at 58th Venice Biennale, 2019
New Order: Art and Technology in the Twenty-First Century at the Museum of Modern Art, New York, 2019
BOB at Gladstone Gallery, 2019
BOB at Serpentine Galleries, 2018
Emissaries at Julia Stoschek Collection, 2018
Etre moderne: Le MoMA à Paris at Fondation Louis Vuitton, 2017
Being There at Louisiana Museum of Modern Art, 2017
Ian Cheng at Carnegie Museum of Art, 2017
Emissaries at MoMA PS1, 2017 
"Ten Days Six Nights" at Tate Modern, 2017 
Dreamlands: Immersive Cinema and Art 1905–2016 at Whitney Museum of American Art, 2016
Take Me (I’m Yours), Jewish Museum, New York, 2016
Liverpool Biennial 2016, Liverpool, 2016
WELT AM DRAHT,  Julia Stoschek Collection, Berlin, 2016
Suspended Animation, curated by Gianni Jetzer, Hirshhorn Museum, Washington, 2016
Stranger, Museum of Contemporary Art Cleveland, 2016
Emissary Forks At Perfection at Pilar Corrias, London, 2015
Emissary in the Squat of Gods, curated by Hans Ulrich Obrist, Fondazione Sandretto Re Rebaudengo, Turin, 2015
"Real Humans", curated by Elodie Evers, Irina Raskin, Kunsthalle Düsseldorf, 2015
Ian Cheng, curated by Filipa Ramos, Triennale Di Milano,  Milan, 2014
Entropy Wrangler Cloud, Frame, Frieze London, London, 2013 
Entropy Wrangler Off Vendome, Düsseldorf, 2013

Collections
Cheng's work is collected by institutions including Museum of Modern Art, New York; Whitney Museum of American Art, New York; Museum of Contemporary Art, Los Angeles; Migros Museum, Zurich; Louis Vuitton Foundation, Paris; Astrup Fearnley Museum, Oslo; Fondazione Sandretto Re Rebaudengo, Turin; Julia Stoschek Collection, Düsseldorf; Yuz Museum, Shanghai.

References

External links 
 
 
 Ian Cheng: Emissary's Guide to Worlding
 Ian Cheng: Forking at Perfection
 Ian Cheng: Live Simulations
 Pilar Corrias Gallery
 Gladstone Gallery
 Standard(OSLO)

1984 births
University of California, Berkeley alumni
Artists from Los Angeles
Living people
Columbia University School of the Arts alumni
People from the San Fernando Valley
Van Nuys High School alumni